MV Ulster Queen was a passenger ferry operated across the Irish Sea between 1930 and 1940. She became an auxiliary anti-aircraft cruiser, HMS Ulster Queen and never returned to civilian service.

History
The Belfast Steamship Co. received three 3,700 ton Harland and Wolff-built motorships in 1929 and 1930, the world's first diesel cross-channel ships. Ulster Queen was the second  of these.

Ulster Queen ran aground off Maughold Head on the Isle of Man on 28 February 1940. She was refloated on 27 March and taken to Belfast for repairs.

Requisitioned by the Admiralty as an auxiliary anti-aircraft cruiser, she was substantially modified. Her boat deck and one funnel were removed and armour plating was added to the hull. She was armed with six 4-inch guns in three turrets and smaller AA weapons. Commissioned as HMS Ulster Queen, she was purchased outright by the Admiralty and served with the Russian convoys, in the Mediterranean and in the Far East before being paid off on 1 April 1946. The modifications were too substantial for her to return to passenger service. She was laid up, and eventually scrapped in 1950.

Service
 Liverpool - Belfast (1930 - 1940)
 Wartime service with the Russian convoys, in the Mediterranean and in the Far East.

References

Ferries of the United Kingdom
1929 ships
Ships built by Harland and Wolff
Auxiliary anti-aircraft ships of the Royal Navy